Strophanthus thollonii, or Thollon's strophanthus, is a plant in the dogbane family Apocynaceae.

Description
Its fragrant flowers feature a white turning yellow, pink and purple corolla, white and red or purple-streaked on the inside. The plant has been used as arrow poison.

Distribution and habitat
Strophanthus thollonii is native to Ivory Coast, Nigeria, Cameroon and Gabon. Its habitat is forest riverbanks from sea level to  altitude.

References

thollonii
Flora of Ivory Coast
Flora of Nigeria
Flora of Cameroon
Flora of Gabon
Plants described in 1893